is a Japanese football forward who currently plays for AC Nagano Parceiro in J3 League.

Club
Updated to 23 February 2018.

1Includes Japanese Super Cup.

Honours
Kashiwa Reysol
Emperor's Cup (1): 2012
J. League Cup (1): 2013

References

External links
Profile at V-Varen Nagasaki
Profile at Kashiwa Reysol

1994 births
Living people
Association football people from Chiba Prefecture
Japanese footballers
J1 League players
J2 League players
J3 League players
Kashiwa Reysol players
V-Varen Nagasaki players
Kataller Toyama players
AC Nagano Parceiro players
J.League U-22 Selection players
Association football midfielders